Chevrolet Prisma may refer to:

The sedan version of the Chevrolet Celta, commonly called the Mk I.
The sedan version of the Chevrolet Onix, commonly called the Mk II.

Prisma
Subcompact cars

Set index articles on cars